The women's 100 metres event at the 2001 European Athletics U23 Championships was held in Amsterdam, Netherlands, at Olympisch Stadion on 12 and 13 July.

Medalists

Results

Final
13 July
Wind: -1.2 m/s

Heats
12 July
Qualified: first 2 in each heat and 2 best to the Final

Heat 1
Wind: -0.2 m/s

Heat 2
Wind: 1.1 m/s

Heat 3
Wind: 0.2 m/s

Participation
According to an unofficial count, 23 athletes from 13 countries participated in the event.

 (3)
 (1)
 (2)
 (3)
 (2)
 (2)
 (1)
 (1)
 (1)
 (1)
 (1)
 (2)
 (3)

References

100 metres
100 metres at the European Athletics U23 Championships